Grace Antony (born 9 April 1997) is an Indian actress, model and classical dancer who works in the Malayalam film industry. Her debut film was Happy Wedding (2016) at the age of 18.

She rose to fame after her performance in the Mollywood hit film Kumbalangi Nights (2019). She achieved further critical and commercial success for her lead roles in films like Thamaasha (2019), Halal love story (2020), Saajan Bakery Since 1962 (2021), Kanakam Kaamini Kalaham (2021), Rorschach (2022) and Appan (2022).

Early life

She is from Mulamthuruthy. She is a Post-Graduate, and also received her bachelor's degree in Bharatanatyam.

Filmography 

Films
All films are in Malayalam language unless otherwise noted.

Short films

References

External links
 

Living people
Indian film actresses
Actresses in Malayalam cinema
21st-century Indian actresses
People from Ernakulam district
1997 births